Pozdrav iz zemlje Safari is the third studio album by Yugoslav band Zabranjeno Pušenje released in 1987. It was released through Diskoton in SFR Yugoslavia.

Legacy

Screenplay
In 2006, Vladimir Đurđević, a first-year dramaturgy student at the University of Arts' Faculty of Dramatic Arts (FDU), wrote a script based on the "Balada o Pišonji i Žugi" track as part of a school assignment. Though mostly relying on "Balada o Pišonji i Žugi", the script also references other Zabranjeno pušenje songs such as "Pamtim to kao da je bilo danas", "Lutka sa naslovne strane", "Hadžija il bos", "Murga drot", "Guzonjin sin", and "Pišonja i Žuga u paklu droge". Đurđević placed the plot in summer 1990 on the eve of the Yugoslavia vs. West Germany match at the 1990 FIFA World Cup with two lifelong friends from Sarajevo of differing ethno-religious backgrounds and football club loyalties (Pišonja, a Bosniak who's a fan of FK Sarajevo, and Žuga, a Serb pulling for FK Željezničar) trying to get to Dubrovnik.

Theater staging
Đurđević's script got staged under Slađana Kilibarda's direction, premiering on 20 November 2010 as Zbogom žohari at Toša Jovanović Theater in Zrenjanin. Kilibarda decided to make a few modifications to Đurđević's script, such as placing the plot a year later in summer 1991, the start of Yugoslav Wars.

On 11 March 2012, another theatrical staging premiered at Belgrade's Atelje 212, directed by Vladan Đurković as Balada o Pišonji i Žugi with Milan Marić playing the role of Pišonja, Nikola Jovanović as Žuga, Tamara Dragičević as Amila, Ivan Zekić as Guzonjin sin, and Zoran Cvijanović as Murga Drot. In addition to Atelje 212, the play is also performed at Dadov Youth Theater.

Track listing
Source: Discogs

Personnel
Credits adapted from the album's liner notes.

Zabranjeno pušenje
 Dražen Janković (credited as Seid Karajlić) – keyboards, backing vocals
 Ognjen Gajić – saxophone, flute
 Sejo Sexon – rhythm guitar
 Predrag Kovačević (credited as Kowalski) – lead guitar
 Dado Džihan – keyboards, backing vocals 
 Darko Ostojić (credited as Oggie) – bass, backing vocals 
 Emir Kusturica – bass
 Faris Arapović – drums
 Nele Karajlić – lead vocals

Additional musicians
 Predrag Bobić Bleka (credited as Dragan Bobić) – bass, backing vocals 
 Vlado Džihan – piano, trombone
 Goran Petranović (credited as Rizo Kurtović) – backing vocals
 Ljilja Košpić – backing vocals
 Goran Grbić – brass section
 Milivoje Marković – brass section
 Tihomir Jakšić – brass section
 Vladimir Krnetić – brass section
 Željko Nestorov – brass section

Production
Sven Rustempašić – production
Toby Alington – sound engineering (Olympic Studio in London, UK)
Rajko Bartula – recording
Goran Micić – recording assistant
Miro Purivatra – executive production

Design
 Zenit Đozić – design
Kemal Hadžić – photos

References

1987 albums
Zabranjeno Pušenje albums